Ragini is a given name mostly used in Nepal & India.

Ragini may refer to:
Rāgini, the feminine counterpart of a raga, a melodic mode in Indian classical music

People
Ragini (actress) (1937–1976), Indian film actress, one of the Travancore sisters
Ragini Trivedi (born 1960),  Indian classical musician
Ragini (Telugu actress), Telugu comedic actress
Ragini (Shamshad Begum) (1922–2007), Indian cinema and later Pakistani cinema actress
Ragini Khanna, Indian Hindi film and television actress
Ragini Dwivedi (born 1990), Indian film actress and model
Ragini Nandwani (born 1989), Indian film and television actress
Ragini Shah (born 1958), Indian film, stage and television actress
Ragini Shankar, Indian violinist

Films
Raagini (film), a 1958 Indian film
Ragini (film), an Indian Malayalam film
Ragini MMS, Indian Hindi movie released in 2011
Ragini MMS 2, Indian Hindi movie released in 2014